{{Taxobox
| name = Okenia academica
| image = 
| image_width = 
| image_caption = 
| regnum = Animalia
| phylum = Mollusca
| classis = Gastropoda
| unranked_superfamilia = clade Heterobranchia
clade Euthyneura
clade Nudipleura
clade Nudibranchia
clade Euctenidiacea
clade Doridacea
| superfamilia = Onchidoridoidea
| familia = Goniodorididae
| genus = Okenia
| species = O. academica
| binomial = Okenia academica| binomial_authority = Camacho-García & Gosliner, 2004
}}Okenia academica is a species of sea slug, specifically a dorid nudibranch, a marine gastropod mollusc in the family Goniodorididae.

Distribution

Description
This Okenia'' has a broad body and eight lateral papillae. The body is opaque white and the back is covered with small round red-brown tubercles.

Ecology
The diet of this species is unknown.

References

Goniodorididae
Gastropods described in 2004